Turbi may refer to:

Another term for the qanbus, a Yemeni lute
Druine Turbi, a 1950s French light aircraft
The Lombard language name for the municipality of Retorbido, Pavia province, Italy
Turbi (Kenya), an area northwest of Marsabit in Kenya
Tu mi turbi ("You Upset Me"), a 1983 Italian comedy film